Tulu cinema, also known as Coastalwood, is a part of Indian cinema. The Tulu film industry produces five to seven films annually. The first Tulu film was Enna Thangadi released in 1971. Usually, earlier, these films were released in theatres across the Tulu Nadu region. But currently the Tulu film industry has grown to such an extent that films are being released simultaneously in Mangalore, Udupi, Mumbai, Bangalore and Gulf countries. The critically acclaimed Tulu film Suddha won the award for the best Indian Film at the Osian's Cinefan Festival of Asian and Arab Cinema held in New Delhi in 2006. In 2011, the Tulu film Industry got a second lease of life with the release of the film Oriyardori Asal. The film turned out to be the biggest hit in Tulu film history to date. Chaali Polilu is the longest running film in Tulu film industry. This movie is the highest-grossing film in the Tulu film industry. It has successfully completed 470 days at PVR Cinemas in Mangalore.

On 27 February 2016, Times of India carried a special report regarding the Tulu cinema industry where it was observed that in its 45-year history, of the Tulu industry, only 45 movies were released for the first 40 years from 1971 to 2011, whereas in the five years since then, 21 films have been made. It also identified Oriyardori Asal (with 1,000-plus houseful shows and a 175-day run in the Tulu-dominated regions of south Karnataka) as the turning point of the industry. It also reported that eight films were made in 2014 and eleven films were made in 2015 and identified Kudla Cafe as the 66th film from the Tulu film industry. It also reported that another movie that broke records was Chaali Polilu, a 2014 social comedy film by Virendra Shetty Kavoor, which had a run of 470 shows at a popular multiplex in Mangalore, playing to full houses on the weekends and 50% occupancy on weekdays. It also reported that with a modest budget of Rs 40 lakhs to Rs 60 lakhs, Tulu films stood out with their touch of reality.

For a language native to about two million people, the main audience for Tulu films is limited to two districts – Dakshina Kannada, Udupi and Kasargod taluk. They also see a limited release in Mumbai, Bengaluru and Dubai.

The 2014 movie Madime was reported to be remade in Marathi, thereby becoming the first Tulu movie to be remade in another language. Shutterdulai is the first remake in Tulu cinema. Eregla Panodchi is the second remake in Tulu cinemas. A suit for damages of Rs. 25 lakhs was filed against the makers of the Telugu film Brahmotsavam for copying the first 36 seconds of the song  by Dr. Vamana Nandaavara found on the Deepanalike CD composed for the Siri channel. The song was used in the movie in a sequence involving the lead actor who, while accompanying his family on a tour, dances to the tune of the hit Tulu song. Prajavani reported that with its dubbing rights sold to Hindi for 21 lakhs, the 2018 movie Umil became the first Tulu movie to achieve the feat.

Ashwini Kotiyan (Chaya Harsha) became the first female director in the Tulu industry after directing and releasing her first movie Namma Kudla. Brahmashree Narayana Guruswamy released on 2 May 2014 was the 50th Tulu film. Panoda Bodcha marked the 75th release anniversary of a Tulu film. The 100th Tulu movie Karne was released on 16 November 2018.

Major achievements

List of Tulu films

 List of Tulu films of 2022
List of Tulu films of 2021
List of Tulu films of 2020
List of Tulu films of 2019
List of Tulu films of 2018
List of Tulu films of 2017
List of Tulu films of 2016
List of Tulu films of 2015
List of Tulu films of 2014
List of Tulu-language films

See also
Tulu language
Tulu Nadu

References

External links
List of Tulu films at the Internet Movie Database (IMDb)

 
Tulu language
 
Cinema of Karnataka
Cinema by language of India
Lists of Indian films
Tulu Nadu